The land of Wilsonville, Pennsylvania and the surrounding area in the valley was purchased by PPL Corporation from about 100 owners at about $20 an acre, and all property was razed or moved in order to build a dam to create what is now Lake Wallenpaupack. Seventeen miles of roads and telephone poles were rerouted, and one cemetery had to be relocated. The original town of Wilsonville now lies under the water near the dam.

References

External links 
 Wilsonville at Hometown Locator

Unincorporated communities in Pennsylvania
Geography of Pike County, Pennsylvania
Former populated places in Pennsylvania